The 2019–20 Los Angeles Lakers season was the franchise's 72nd season, its 71st season in the National Basketball Association (NBA), and its 60th in Los Angeles. The Lakers were coached by Frank Vogel in his first year as team head coach. The Lakers played their home games at Staples Center as members of the Western Conference's Pacific Division. The Lakers had the third best team defensive rating in the NBA.

On March 6, 2020, the Lakers clinched their first playoff berth since the 2012–13 season. Five days later, due to the ongoing COVID-19 pandemic, the season was suspended. On July 5, the NBA announced a return of the season in the NBA Bubble, with 22 teams playing 8 seeding games followed by a full postseason. Play resumed on July 30 with all games being played in Orlando, Florida, and on August 3, the Lakers clinched both their first Pacific Division title since 2012 and the top seed in the Western Conference playoffs for the first time since the 2009–10 season.

The Lakers finished the season 52–19, with a winning percentage equal to 60 games in a full 82-game season. They defeated the Portland Trail Blazers, Houston Rockets, and Denver Nuggets each in five games to advance to the NBA Finals for the first time since 2010. There they defeated the Miami Heat (LeBron James' former team) in six games to earn the franchise's 17th NBA championship, tying them with the Boston Celtics for the most of any NBA franchise. The team dedicated the season and the Finals win to Kobe Bryant who was killed in a helicopter crash on January 26, 2020.

Previous season 
The Lakers finished the 2018–19 season 37–45 to finish in fourth place in the Pacific Division and failing to qualify for the playoffs for the sixth consecutive year. Following the season, Magic Johnson stepped down as president of basketball operations. On April 12, 2019, head coach Luke Walton and the team agreed to part ways. On May 11, the Lakers hired Frank Vogel as head coach. The season marked the first time since 2005 that LeBron James did not appear in the playoffs and first time since 2010 that he missed the Finals.

Offseason

Front office and coaching changes 
On April 9, 2019, Magic Johnson stepped down as president of basketball operations. Three days after that, Luke Walton and the team agreed to part ways. On May 13, the team hired Frank Vogel as their new head coach and Jason Kidd was named an assistant coach.

Draft

The Lakers held one first round draft pick for the 2019 NBA Draft. They previously held the rights to two second rounders in this year's draft as well, but those selections were later traded to the Philadelphia 76ers and Atlanta Hawks as picks 34 and 41, respectively. On the night of the NBA draft lottery, the Lakers rose up seven spots from the projected 11th selection to the 4th pick of the draft. On June 15, the Lakers agreed to a trade that would send players Brandon Ingram, Lonzo Ball, and Josh Hart, and multiple draft picks, including the Lakers' 2019 1st round draft pick, to the New Orleans Pelicans in exchange for Anthony Davis. However, the trade was not finalized until July 6, during which time, the Washington Wizards were included in the deal as well.

Trades 
On June 15, 2019, the Lakers agreed to a trade with the New Orleans Pelicans to acquire six-time NBA All-Star power forward Anthony Davis, though the deal would not take full effect until July 6. In exchange for Davis, the Lakers agreed to give up forward Brandon Ingram, guards Lonzo Ball and Josh Hart, three first round picks (including their No. 4 overall selection in 2019), and a first round pick swap in 2023.

On June 27, the Washington Wizards joined the trade to get Moritz Wagner, Isaac Bonga, Jemerrio Jones, and the Lakers' 2022 second-round pick in exchange for cash considerations.

Free Agents
During the offseason, the Lakers were able to re-sign G Rajon Rondo, G Alex Caruso, G/F Kentavious Caldwell-Pope and C JaVale McGee. The Lakers also signed several veteran free agents to compliment James and Davis: G/F Danny Green, G Avery Bradley and C Dwight Howard were among the most notable acquisitions.

Preseason

Game log

|- style="background:#cfc;"
| 1
| October 5
| @ Golden State
| 
| Anthony Davis (22)
| JaVale McGee (13)
| LeBron James (8)
| Chase Center  18,064
| 1–0
|- style="background:#fcc;"
| 2
| October 10
| Brooklyn
| 
| LeBron James (20)
| JaVale McGee (10)
| Alex Caruso (8)
| Mercedes-Benz Arena15,992
| 1–1
|- style="background:#fcc;"
| 3
| October 12
| Brooklyn
| 
| Avery Bradley (14)
| Howard, Caldwell-Pope (6)
| Alex Caruso (5)
| Universiade Sports Center17,396
| 1–2
|- style="background:#cfc;"
| 4
| October 14
| Golden State
| 
| Zach Norvell Jr. (22)
| Dwight Howard (13)
| David Stockton (7)
| Staples Center18,997
| 2–2
|- style="background:#cfc;"
| 5
| October 16
| Golden State
| 
| James, Bradley (18)
| Anthony Davis (10)
| LeBron James (11)
| Staples Center18,997
| 3–2
|- style="background:#fcc;"
| 6
| October 18
| @ Golden State
| 
| Kentavious Caldwell-Pope (25)
| Devontae Cacok (10)
| Demetrius Jackson (9)
| Chase Center18,064
| 3–3

Regular season

Standings

Division

Conference

Game log 

|- style="background:#fcc;"
| 1
| October 22
| @ L. A. Clippers
| 
| Danny Green (28)
| Anthony Davis (10)
| LeBron James (8)
| Staples Center19,068
| 0–1
|- style="background:#cfc;"
| 2
| October 25
| Utah
| 
| LeBron James (32)
| James, Davis, Howard (7)
| LeBron James (10)
| Staples Center18,997
| 1–1
|- style="background:#cfc;"
| 3
| October 27
| Charlotte
| 
| Anthony Davis (29)
| Anthony Davis (14)
| LeBron James (12)
| Staples Center18,997
| 2–1
|- style="background:#cfc;"
| 4
| October 29
| Memphis
| 
| Anthony Davis (40)
| Anthony Davis (20)
| LeBron James (8)
| Staples Center18,997
| 3–1

|- style="background:#cfc;"
| 5
| November 1
| @ Dallas
| 
| LeBron James (39)
| LeBron James (12)
| LeBron James (16)
| American Airlines Center20,358
| 4–1
|- style="background:#cfc;"
| 6
| November 3
| @ San Antonio
| 
| Anthony Davis (25)
| Dwight Howard (13)
| LeBron James (13)
| AT&T Center18,610
| 5–1
|- style="background:#cfc;"
| 7
| November 5
| @ Chicago
| 
| LeBron James (30)
| LeBron James (10)
| LeBron James (11)
| United Center21,193
| 6–1
|- style="background:#cfc;"
| 8
| November 8
| Miami
| 
| Anthony Davis (26)
| JaVale McGee (10)
| Anthony Davis (7)
| Staples Center18,997
| 7–1
|- style="background:#fcc;"
| 9
| November 10
| Toronto
| 
| Anthony Davis (27)
| LeBron James (13)
| LeBron James (15)
| Staples Center18,997
| 7–2
|- style="background:#cfc;"
| 10
| November 12
| @ Phoenix
| 
| Anthony Davis (24)
| Anthony Davis (12)
| LeBron James (11)
| Talking Stick Resort Arena18,055
| 8–2
|- style="background:#cfc;"
| 11
| November 13
| Golden State
| 
| LeBron James (23)
| JaVale McGee (17)
| LeBron James (12)
| Staples Center18,997
| 9–2
|- style="background:#cfc;"
| 12
| November 15
| Sacramento
| 
| LeBron James (29)
| Howard, McGee (7)
| LeBron James (11)
| Staples Center18,997
| 10–2
|- style="background:#cfc;"
| 13
| November 17
| Atlanta
| 
| LeBron James (33)
| Dwight Howard (9)
| LeBron James (12)
| Staples Center18,997
| 11–2
|- style="background:#cfc;"
| 14
| November 19
| Oklahoma City
| 
| Anthony Davis (34)
| LeBron James (11)
| James, Rondo (10)
| Staples Center18,997
| 12–2
|- style="background:#cfc;"
| 15
| November 22
| @ Oklahoma City
| 
| Anthony Davis (33)
| Anthony Davis (11)
| LeBron James (14)
| Chesapeake Energy Arena18,203
| 13–2
|- style="background:#cfc;"
| 16
| November 23
| @ Memphis
| 
| LeBron James (30)
| Dwight Howard (9)
| Rajon Rondo (6)
| FedExForum17,794
| 14–2
|- style="background:#cfc;"
| 17
| November 25
| @ San Antonio
| 
| LeBron James (33)
| Anthony Davis (12)
| LeBron James (14)
| AT&T Center18,498
| 15–2
|- style="background:#cfc;"
| 18
| November 27
| @ New Orleans
| 
| Anthony Davis (41)
| Anthony Davis (9)
| LeBron James (11)
| Smoothie King Center18,626
| 16–2
|- style="background:#cfc;"
| 19
| November 29
| Washington
| 
| Anthony Davis (26)
| Anthony Davis (13)
| LeBron James (11)
| Staples Center18,997
| 17–2

|- style="background:#fcc;"
| 20
| December 1
| Dallas
| 
| Anthony Davis (27)
| Davis, McGee (10)
| LeBron James (8)
| Staples Center18,997
| 17–3
|- style="background:#cfc;"
| 21
| December 3
| @ Denver
| 
| Davis, James (25)
| Anthony Davis (10)
| LeBron James (9)
| Pepsi Center19,658
| 18–3
|- style="background:#cfc;"
| 22
| December 4
| @ Utah
| 
| Anthony Davis (26)
| Howard, Rondo (9)
| James, Rondo (12)
| Vivint Smart Home Arena18,306
| 19–3
|- style="background:#cfc;"
| 23
| December 6
| @ Portland
| 
| Anthony Davis (39)
| Dwight Howard (10)
| LeBron James (8)
| Moda Center19,912
| 20–3
|- style="background:#cfc;"
| 24
| December 8
| Minnesota
| 
| Anthony Davis (50)
| Danny Green (8)
| LeBron James (13)
| Staples Center18,997
| 21–3
|- style="background:#cfc;"
| 25
| December 11
| @ Orlando
| 
| LeBron James (25)
| Anthony Davis (12)
| LeBron James (10)
| Amway Center18,846
| 22–3
|- style="background:#cfc;"
| 26
| December 13
| @ Miami
| 
| Anthony Davis (33)
| Davis, McGee (10)
| LeBron James (12)
| American Airlines Arena20,013
| 23–3
|- style="background:#cfc;"
| 27
| December 15
| @ Atlanta
| 
| LeBron James (32)
| Davis, James (13)
| LeBron James (7)
| State Farm Arena16,962
| 24–3
|- style="background:#fcc;"
| 28
| December 17
| @ Indiana
| 
| Howard, James (20)
| LeBron James (9)
| LeBron James (9)
| Bankers Life Fieldhouse17,923
| 24–4
|- style="background:#fcc;"
| 29
| December 19
| @ Milwaukee
| 
| Anthony Davis (36)
| LeBron James (12)
| LeBron James (11)
| Fiserv Forum18,051
| 24–5
|- style="background:#fcc;"
| 30
| December 22
| Denver
| 
| Anthony Davis (32)
| Anthony Davis (11)
| Rajon Rondo (8)
| Staples Center18,997
| 24–6
|- style="background:#fcc;"
| 31
| December 25
| L. A. Clippers
| 
| Kyle Kuzma (25)
| Howard, James (9)
| LeBron James (10)
| Staples Center18,997
| 24–7
|- style="background:#cfc;"
| 32
| December 28
| @ Portland
| 
| Kyle Kuzma (24)
| Anthony Davis (9)
| LeBron James (16)
| Moda Center19,960
| 25–7
|- style="background:#cfc;"
| 33
| December 29
| Dallas
| 
| Anthony Davis (23)
| Anthony Davis (9)
| LeBron James (13)
| Staples Center18,997
| 26–7

|- style="background:#cfc;"
| 34
| January 1
| Phoenix
| 
| LeBron James (31)
| LeBron James (13)
| LeBron James (12)
| Staples Center18,997
| 27–7
|- style="background:#cfc;"
| 35
| January 3
| New Orleans
| 
| Anthony Davis (46)
| Anthony Davis (13)
| LeBron James (15)
| Staples Center18,997
| 28–7
|- style="background:#cfc;"
| 36
| January 5
| Detroit
| 
| Anthony Davis (24)
| LeBron James (14)
| LeBron James (11)
| Staples Center18,997
| 29–7
|- style="background:#cfc;"
| 37
| January 7
| New York
| 
| LeBron James (31)
| Dwight Howard (13)
| Rajon Rondo (10)
| Staples Center18,997
| 30–7
|- style="background:#cfc;"
| 38
| January 10
| @ Dallas
| 
| LeBron James (35)
| LeBron James (16)
| LeBron James (7)
| American Airlines Center20,542
| 31–7
|- style="background:#cfc;"
| 39
| January 11
| @ Oklahoma City
| 
| Kyle Kuzma (36)
| Dwight Howard (14)
| Rajon Rondo (8)
| Chesapeake Energy Arena18,203
| 32–7
|- style="background:#cfc;"
| 40
| January 13
| Cleveland
| 
| LeBron James (31)
| Dwight Howard (15)
| LeBron James (8)
| Staples Center18,997
| 33–7
|- style="background:#fcc;"
| 41
| January 15
| Orlando
| 
| Quinn Cook (22)
| Dwight Howard (16)
| LeBron James (19)
| Staples Center18,997
| 33–8
|- style="background:#cfc;"
| 42
| January 18
| @ Houston
| 
| LeBron James (31)
| Dwight Howard (10)
| LeBron James (12)
| Toyota Center18,502
| 34–8
|- style="background:#fcc;"
| 43
| January 20
| @ Boston
| 
| JaVale McGee (18)
| Dwight Howard (10)
| LeBron James (13)
| TD Garden19,156
| 34–9
|- style="background:#cfc;"
| 44
| January 22
| @ New York
| 
| Anthony Davis (28)
| Dwight Howard (12)
| Davis, James (5)
| Madison Square Garden19,812
| 35–9
|- style="background:#cfc;"
| 45
| January 23
| @ Brooklyn
| 
| LeBron James (27)
| Howard, James (12)
| James, Rondo (10)
| Barclays Center17,732
| 36–9
|- style="background:#fcc;"
| 46
| January 25
| @ Philadelphia
| 
| Anthony Davis (31)
| Davis, James (7)
| LeBron James (8)
| Wells Fargo Center21,109
| 36–10
|- style="background:#bbb;"
| —
| January 28
| LA Clippers
| colspan="6" | Postponed due to the 2020 Calabasas helicopter crash that killed Kobe Bryant. Makeup date July 30 (originally April 9).
|- style="background:#fcc;"
| 47
| January 31
| Portland
| 
| Anthony Davis (37)
| Davis, Kuzma (15)
| LeBron James (10)
| Staples Center18,997
| 36–11

|- style="background:#cfc;"
| 48
| February 1
| @ Sacramento
| 
| Anthony Davis (21)
| LeBron James (10)
| LeBron James (11)
| Golden 1 Center17,583
| 37–11
|- style="background:#cfc;"
| 49
| February 4
| San Antonio
| 
| LeBron James (36)
| Kyle Kuzma (12)
| LeBron James (9)
| Staples Center18,997
| 38–11
|- style="background:#fcc;"
| 50
| February 6
| Houston
| 
| Anthony Davis (32)
| Anthony Davis (13)
| LeBron James (15)
| Staples Center18,997
| 38–12
|- style="background:#cfc;"
| 51
| February 8
| @ Golden State
| 
| Anthony Davis (27)
| Anthony Davis (10)
| LeBron James (11)
| Chase Center18,064
| 39–12
|- style="background:#cfc;"
| 52
| February 10
| Phoenix
| 
| Anthony Davis (25)
| Dwight Howard (15)
| LeBron James (9)
| Staples Center18,997
| 40–12
|- style="background:#cfc;"
| 53
| February 12
| @ Denver
| 
| Anthony Davis (33)
| LeBron James (12)
| LeBron James (14)
| Pepsi Center19,860
| 41–12
|- style="background:#cfc;"
| 54
| February 21
| Memphis
| 
| LeBron James (32)
| Anthony Davis (13)
| LeBron James (7)
| Staples Center18,997
| 42–12
|- style="background:#cfc;"
| 55
| February 23
| Boston
| 
| Anthony Davis (32)
| Anthony Davis (13)
| LeBron James (9)
| Staples Center18,997
| 43–12
|- style="background:#cfc;"
| 56
| February 25
| New Orleans
| 
| LeBron James (40)
| Anthony Davis (14)
| Alex Caruso (8)
| Staples Center18,997
|  44–12
|- style="background:#cfc;"
| 57
| February 27
| @ Golden State
| 
| Anthony Davis (23)
| Dwight Howard (9)
| Rajon Rondo (6)
| Chase Center18,064
| 45–12
|- style="background:#fcc;"
| 58
| February 29
| @ Memphis
| 
| LeBron James (19)
| Anthony Davis (9)
| LeBron James (10)
| FedExForum17,794
| 45–13

|- style="background:#cfc;"
| 59
| March 1
| @ New Orleans
| 
| LeBron James (34)
| LeBron James (12)
| LeBron James (13)
| Smoothie King Center18,547
| 46–13
|- style="background:#cfc;"
| 60
| March 3
| Philadelphia
| 
| Anthony Davis (37)
| Anthony Davis (13)
| LeBron James (14)
| Staples Center18,997
| 47–13
|- style="background:#cfc;"
| 61
| March 6
| Milwaukee
| 
| LeBron James (37)
| JaVale McGee (11)
| LeBron James (8)
| Staples Center18,997
| 48–13
|- style="background:#cfc;"
| 62
| March 8
| @ L. A. Clippers
| 
| Anthony Davis (30)
| Kyle Kuzma (10)
| LeBron James (9)
| Staples Center19,068
| 49–13
|- style="background:#fcc;"
| 63
| March 10
| Brooklyn
| 
| LeBron James (29)
| LeBron James (12)
| LeBron James (9)
| Staples Center18,997
| 49–14

|- style="background:#cfc;"
| 64
| July 30
| L. A. Clippers
| 
| Anthony Davis (34)
| LeBron James (11)
| LeBron James (7)
| The ArenaNo In-Person Attendance
| 50–14
|- style="background:#fcc;"
| 65
| August 1
| @ Toronto
| 
| LeBron James (20)
| LeBron James (10)
| LeBron James (5)
| The ArenaNo In-Person Attendance
| 50–15
|- style="background:#cfc;"
| 66
| August 3
| @ Utah
| 
| Anthony Davis (42)
| Anthony Davis (12)
| LeBron James (9)
| The ArenaNo In-Person Attendance
| 51–15
|- style="background:#fcc;"
| 67
| August 5
| Oklahoma City
| 
| LeBron James (19)
| LeBron James (11)
| Anthony Davis (5)
| HP Field HouseNo In-Person Attendance
| 51–16
|- style="background:#fcc;"
| 68
| August 6
| @ Houston
| 
| Kyle Kuzma (21)
| Dwight Howard (15)
| Quinn Cook (4)
| The ArenaNo In-Person Attendance
| 51–17
|- style="background:#fcc;"
| 69
| August 8
| @ Indiana
| 
| LeBron James (31)
| Dwight Howard (12)
| LeBron James (7)
| HP Field HouseNo In-Person Attendance
| 51–18
|- style="background:#cfc;"
| 70
| August 10
| Denver
| 
| LeBron James (29)
| Markieff Morris (7)
| LeBron James (12)
| The ArenaNo In-Person Attendance
| 52–18
|- style="background:#fcc;"
| 71
| August 13
| Sacramento
| 
| Dion Waiters (19)
| JaVale McGee (9)
| Dudley, Waiters (5)
| HP Field HouseNo In-Person Attendance
| 52–19

|- style="background:#;"
| 64
| March 12
| Houston
| 
|
|
|
| Staples Center
|
|- style="background:#;"
| 65
| March 15
| Denver
| 
|
|
|
| Staples Center
|
|- style="background:#;"
| 66
| March 16
| @ Utah
| 
|
|
|
| Vivint Smart Home Arena
|
|- style="background:#;"
| 67
| March 18
| Utah
| 
|
|
|
| Staples Center
|
|- style="background:#;"
| 68
| March 21
| @ Charlotte
| 
|
|
|
| Spectrum Center
|
|- style="background:#;"
| 69
| March 22
| @ Detroit
| 
|
|
|
| Little Caesars Arena
|
|- style="background:#;"
| 70
| March 24
| @ Toronto
| 
|
|
|
| Scotiabank Arena
|
|- style="background:#;"
| 71
| March 26
| @ Cleveland
| 
|
|
|
| Rocket Mortgage FieldHouse
|
|- style="background:#;"
| 72
| March 28
| @ Washington
| 
|
|
|
| Capital One Arena
|
|- style="background:#;"
| 73
| March 30
| @ Minnesota
| 
|
|
|
| Target Center
|
|- style="background:#;"
| 74
| April 1
| Indiana
| 
|
|
|
| Staples Center
|
|- style="background:#;"
| 75
| April 4
| Sacramento
| 
|
|
|
| Golden 1 Center
|
|- style="background:#;"
| 76
| April 5
| Oklahoma City
| 
|
|
|
| Staples Center
|
|- style="background:#;"
| 77
| April 7
| Golden State
| 
|
|
|
| Staples Center
|
|- style="background:#;"
| 78
| April 8
| Chicago
| 
|
|
|
| Staples Center
|
|- style="background:#;"
| 79
| April 9
| LA Clippers
| 
|
|
|
| Staples Center
|
|- style="background:#;"
| 80
| April 12
| Minnesota
| 
|
|
|
| Staples Center
|
|- style="background:#;"
| 81
| April 14
| Sacramento
| 
|
|
|
| Staples Center
|
|- style="background:#;"
| 82
| April 15
| @ Phoenix
| 
|
|
|
| Talking Stick Resort Arena
|

Season notes 
LeBron James and Davis would be selected to the All-Star Game for the 16th straight, and seventh straight years respectively. James would take Davis with the No. 1 pick in the All-Star draft. Additionally, Vogel was also selected to coach Team LeBron in the All-Star Game. Team LeBron would go on to win 157–155, with Davis hitting a game-winning free throw.

By adding Davis, the Lakers got off to a fast start to the season, which included a 17–2 record by the end of November. Four months later, they were able to clinch their first playoff berth since the 2012–13 season with a win over the Milwaukee Bucks on March 6.

However, five days after clinching their playoff berth, the NBA season was abruptly suspended by league officials  after it was reported that Rudy Gobert of the Utah Jazz tested positive for COVID-19. Two unidentified players of the Lakers would later test positive for COVID-19 on March 19. The season resumed, but Avery Bradley opted out of playing in the restart to remain with his family due to his oldest child, who had a history of struggling to recover from respiratory illnesses. The Lakers replaced him on the roster with J. R. Smith, reuniting him with LeBron whom he won a championship with in 2016 with the Cleveland Cavaliers.

Death of Kobe Bryant 
On January 26, 2020, tragedy struck the Lakers organization when former All-Star guard Kobe Bryant died in a helicopter crash that also claimed the lives of his daughter Gianna "Gigi" Bryant and seven other passengers. Bryant was 41 at the time of his death, and Gigi was 13. This prompted the Lakers to dedicate the rest of their season to his memory.

Playoffs

Game log 

|- style="background:#fcc;"
| 1
| August 18
| Portland
| 
| Anthony Davis (28)
| LeBron James (17)
| LeBron James (16)
| The ArenaNo In-Person Attendance
| 0–1
|- style="background:#cfc;"
| 2
| August 20
| Portland
| 
| Anthony Davis (31)
| Anthony Davis (11)
| LeBron James (7)
| The ArenaNo In-Person Attendance
| 1–1
|- style="background:#cfc;"
| 3
| August 22
| @ Portland
| 
| LeBron James (38)
| LeBron James (12)
| Davis, James (8)
| AdventHealth ArenaNo In-Person Attendance
| 2–1
|- style="background:#cfc;"
| 4
| August 24
| @ Portland
| 
| LeBron James (30)
| Howard, McGee (8)
| LeBron James (10)
| The ArenaNo In-Person Attendance
| 3–1
|- style="background:#cfc;"
| 5
| August 29†
| Portland
| 
| Anthony Davis (43)
| LeBron James (10)
| LeBron James (10)
| The ArenaNo In-Person Attendance
| 4–1

|- style="background:#fcc;"
| 1
| September 4
| Houston
| 
| Anthony Davis (25)
| Anthony Davis (14)
| LeBron James (7)
| The ArenaNo In-Person Attendance
| 0–1
|- style="background:#cfc;"
| 2
| September 6
| Houston
| 
| Anthony Davis (34)
| LeBron James (11)
| James, Rondo (9)
| The ArenaNo In-Person Attendance
| 1–1
|- style="background:#cfc;"
| 3
| September 8
| @ Houston
| 
| LeBron James (36)
| Anthony Davis (15)
| Rajon Rondo (9)
| The ArenaNo In-Person Attendance
| 2–1
|- style="background:#cfc;"
| 4
| September 10
| @ Houston
| 
| Anthony Davis (29)
| LeBron James (15)
| LeBron James (9)
| The ArenaNo In-Person Attendance
| 3–1
|- style="background:#cfc;"
| 5
| September 12
| Houston
| 
| LeBron James (29)
| Davis, James (11)
| LeBron James (7)
| The ArenaNo In-Person Attendance
| 4–1

|- style="background:#cfc;"
| 1
| September 18
| Denver
| 
| Anthony Davis (37)
| Anthony Davis (10)
| LeBron James (12)
| The ArenaNo In-Person Attendance
| 1–0
|- style="background:#cfc;"
| 2
| September 20
| Denver
| 
| Anthony Davis (31)
| LeBron James (11)
| Rajon Rondo (9)
| The ArenaNo In-Person Attendance
| 2–0
|- style="background:#fcc;"
| 3
| September 22
| @ Denver
| 
| LeBron James (30)
| LeBron James (10)
| LeBron James (11)
| The ArenaNo In-Person Attendance
| 2–1
|- style="background:#cfc;"
| 4
| September 24
| @ Denver
| 
| Anthony Davis (34)
| Dwight Howard (11)
| LeBron James (8)
| The ArenaNo In-Person Attendance
| 3–1
|- style="background:#cfc;"
| 5
| September 26
| Denver
| 
| LeBron James (38)
| LeBron James (16)
| LeBron James (10)
| The ArenaNo In-Person Attendance
| 4–1

|- style="background:#cfc;"
| 1
| September 30
| Miami
| 
| Anthony Davis (34)
| LeBron James (13)
| LeBron James (9)
| The ArenaNo In-Person Attendance
| 1–0
|- style="background:#cfc;"
| 2
| October 2
| Miami
| 
| LeBron James (33)
| Anthony Davis (14)
| Rajon Rondo (10)
| The ArenaNo In-Person Attendance
| 2–0
|- style="background:#fcc;"
| 3
| October 4
| @ Miami
| 
| LeBron James (25)
| LeBron James (10)
| LeBron James (8)
| The ArenaNo In-Person Attendance
| 2–1
|- style="background:#cfc;"
| 4
| October 6
| @ Miami
| 
| LeBron James (28)
| LeBron James (12)
| LeBron James (8)
| The ArenaNo In-Person Attendance
| 3–1
|- style="background:#fcc;"
| 5
| October 9
| Miami
| 
| LeBron James (40)
| LeBron James (13)
| LeBron James (7)
| The ArenaNo In-Person Attendance
| 3–2
|- style="background:#cfc;"
| 6
| October 11
| @ Miami
| 
| LeBron James (28)
| Anthony Davis (15)
| LeBron James (10)
| The ArenaNo In-Person Attendance
| 4–2

† Originally scheduled for August 26. Game 5 was rescheduled due to a boycott from NBA players following the police involved shooting of Jacob Blake.

Playoff notes 
In the NBA playoffs, the Lakers faced off against the eight-seed Portland Trail Blazers in the first round and won the series in 5 games. In Western Conference semi-finals, they faced off against the fourth seed Houston Rockets, again winning in five games. They advanced to the Western Conference Finals for the first time since 2010, where they faced and defeated the Denver Nuggets in five games. They reached the NBA Finals for the first time in a decade, where they faced off the Eastern Conference champion Miami Heat, marking the first meeting between the two teams in the NBA Finals. The Lakers won the series in 6 games, winning the championship for the first time since the 2010 season. They became the first team since the 2007–08 Boston Celtics to go directly from a non-playoff season to a championship. This championship win also saw the Lakers tie the Celtics with the highest number of NBA championship wins at 17. The Lakers' LeBron James was named the NBA Finals Most Valuable Player (MVP) for the fourth time in his career. He became the first player in league history to be named Finals MVP with three different franchises (two with the Heat, one with the Cleveland Cavaliers, and one with the Lakers) and he and Danny Green became the third and fourth players to win the NBA Finals with three different teams. Lakers president Jeanie Buss became the first female controlling owner to guide her team to an NBA title.

Roster

Transactions

Overview

Trades

Free agency

Re-signed

Additions

Subtractions

Notes

References

Los Angeles Lakers seasons
Los Angeles Lakers
Los Angeles Lakers
Los Angeles Lakers
Lakers
Lakers
Western Conference (NBA) championship seasons
NBA championship seasons